The Orton Memorial Laboratory is a historic building in the Weinland Park neighborhood of Columbus, Ohio. It was listed on the National Register of Historic Places in 1983.

Built in 1929, Orton Memorial Laboratory was originally used as the headquarters for the Standard Pyrometric Cone Company. The company was established by the son of the founding president of the Ohio State University. The laboratory was designed by Howard Dwight Smith, the same architect who designed the Thompson Library and the Ohio Stadium. A recent rehabilitation project turned the laboratory into a modern industrial office space.

Additions to the building include the west wing, added in 1956, and the east wing, added in 1962.

See also
 National Register of Historic Places listings in Columbus, Ohio

References

Commercial buildings on the National Register of Historic Places in Ohio
Neoclassical architecture in Ohio
Commercial buildings completed in 1929
Buildings and structures in Columbus, Ohio
National Register of Historic Places in Columbus, Ohio
Columbus Register properties